Ian Strange may refer to:
 Ian Strange (British artist)
 Ian Strange (Australian artist)

See also
 Ian Strang, British draughtsman and etcher